Lars Christer Bäckström (born March 16, 1953 in Uddevalla) is a Swedish Left Party politician. He was a member of the Parliament of Sweden 1988–2006. In 2008 he was appointed Governor of Västra Götaland County.

Bibliography 
Motions to the Swedish Parliament 1999/2000_proposing national support of the Incubator Project_Venture Capital

See also 
Riksdag: Swedish Parliament

External links 
'Communists we are no longer, Social Democrats we can never be': The Evolution of the Leftist Parties in Finland and Sweden, Author: Arter D, The Journal of Communist Studies and Transition Politics, Volume 18, Number 3, September 01, 2002 , pp. 1-28(28)

1953 births
Living people
Members of the Riksdag 1988–1991
Members of the Riksdag 1991–1994
Members of the Riksdag 1994–1998
Members of the Riksdag 1998–2002
Members of the Riksdag 2002–2006
Members of the Riksdag from the Left Party (Sweden)
People from Uddevalla Municipality